Saint Laura of Cordoba (died 864) was a Spanish Christian who lived in Muslim Spain during the 9th century. She was born in Córdoba, and became a nun at Cuteclara after her husband died, eventually rising to become an abbess. She was martyred by Muslims, who took her captive and scalded her to death by placing her in a vat of boiling pitch. Her feast day is on 19 October; she is one of the Martyrs of Córdoba.

She is commemorated by the Estadio Santa Laura ("Saint Laura Stadium") in Santiago, Chile and the Humberstone and Santa Laura Saltpeter Works in northern Chile.

Thomas Love Peacock wrote a ballad about Saint Laura in his work Gryll Grange.

References

864 deaths
Spanish Roman Catholic saints
9th-century Christian martyrs
9th-century Christian saints
Christian saints killed by Muslims
Year of birth unknown
Female saints of medieval Spain
9th-century Spanish women
9th-century people from al-Andalus
Medieval Spanish saints
People from Córdoba, Spain